The 2007 Louisiana–Lafayette Ragin' Cajuns baseball team represented the University of Louisiana at Lafayette in the 2007 NCAA Division I baseball season. The Ragin' Cajuns played their home games at M. L. Tigue Moore Field and were led by thirteenth year head coach Tony Robichaux.

Roster

Coaching staff

Schedule and results

College Station Regional

References

Louisiana Ragin' Cajuns baseball seasons
Louisiana-Lafayette baseball
Louisiana-Lafayette
Sun Belt Conference baseball champion seasons
Louisiana–Lafayette